Hobson's Choice is an historic home located near Alberta, Brunswick County, Virginia. It was built in the Palladian style about 1794 by Dr. Richard Feild for his bride Ann Meade, on land the groom bought from his father-in-law. The
Edinburgh educated physician also had considerable knowledge of botany and astronomy, edited The Intelligencer and Petersburg Commercial Advertiser, and three times served as a Presidential elector. Although Feild died in 1829, the plantation stayed in the family until 1870.

The one-story brick structure has a central pavilion with flanking wings connected by hyphens in a late-Georgian style.  A stone addition was built about 1860, a brick room added in 1947, and a frame enclosed porch about 1953.

It was listed on the National Register of Historic Places in 1980.

References

Houses on the National Register of Historic Places in Virginia
Palladian Revival architecture in Virginia
Houses completed in 1794
Houses in Brunswick County, Virginia
National Register of Historic Places in Brunswick County, Virginia
1794 establishments in Virginia